Yakov Izrailevich Zak,, Jiakov Israilevič Sak; Odessa,  – Moscow, 28 June 1976) was a Soviet and Russian pianist and pedagogue. People's Artist of the USSR (1966).

Born in Odessa, Zak studied piano at the Odessa Conservatory with Maria Starkhova, took classes on special harmony with Mykola Vilinsky, and later studied with Heinrich Neuhaus in Moscow, graduating in 1935. Having made his debut in 1935, he rose to prominence when he won First Prize and the Mazurka Prize at the III International Chopin Piano Competition in 1937. From 1935 Zak taught at the Moscow Conservatory, becoming a professor in 1947 and being granted a chair in 1965. His pupils include Eliso Virsaladze, Irina Zaritskaya, Nikolai Petrov, Evgeny Mogilevsky, Svetlana Navasardyan, Lyubov Timofeyeva, Valery Afanassiev, Ludmila Knezkova-Hussey, Vladimir Bakk, and Youri Egorov.

References 

Yakov Zak, biography 
Yakov Zak, Stat'i, Materially, Vospominaniia (Papers, Documents, Memoirs), Moscow, "Sovetskii Kompozitor", 1980 

1913 births
1976 deaths
20th-century classical composers
20th-century classical pianists
Musicians from Odesa
Communist Party of the Soviet Union members
Moscow Conservatory alumni
Academic staff of Moscow Conservatory
People's Artists of the RSFSR
People's Artists of the USSR
Recipients of the Order of the Red Banner of Labour
International Chopin Piano Competition winners
Jewish classical composers
Jewish classical pianists
Ukrainian classical pianists
Odesa Jews
Russian classical pianists
Russian male classical composers
Russian music educators
Soviet classical pianists
Soviet male classical composers
Soviet music educators
Burials at Kuntsevo Cemetery